The Wilmington/Newark Line is a route of the SEPTA Regional Rail commuter rail system in the Philadelphia area. The line serves southeastern Pennsylvania and northern Delaware, with stations in Marcus Hook, Pennsylvania, Wilmington, Delaware, and Newark, Delaware. It is the longest of the 13 SEPTA Regional Rail lines.

Route
The Wilmington/Newark Line runs on Amtrak's Northeast Corridor, making local stops along the way.

Only weekday peak trains run to Newark. One morning train to Newark runs as an express service from University City to Chester before turning into a local serving Marcus Hook and the Delaware stations. All trains on weekends terminate at Wilmington. Service in Delaware is funded in part by the Delaware Department of Transportation (DelDOT).

, most weekday Wilmington/Newark trains operate through the Center City tunnel to and from Lansdale/Doylestown Line points. Most weekend Wilmington trains run through to and from Elm Street in Norristown on the Manayunk/Norristown Line.

History
The line north of Wilmington was originally built by the Philadelphia, Wilmington and Baltimore Railroad. The original alignment was opened January 17, 1838, and on November 18, 1872, a realignment opened north of Chester (part of the old route is now used for the Airport Line). South of Wilmington the line was built by the Wilmington and Susquehanna Railroad and opened July 31, 1837. The Pennsylvania Railroad obtained control in the early 1880s. Electrified service was opened between Philadelphia and Wilmington on September 30, 1928. Electrified operation was extended to Newark and beyond to Washington, D.C. on February 10, 1935. In 1968, the Pennsylvania Railroad merged into Penn Central. In 1976 Conrail took over, and SEPTA took over on January 1, 1983. When SEPTA took over service, commuter rail service in Delaware was eliminated, with the Claymont and Edgemoor stations closed.

Under SEPTA, commuter service from Philadelphia originally terminated in Marcus Hook. On January 16, 1989, service was extended south into Delaware to end at Wilmington. A stop was added in Claymont in 1991. In the mid-1990s, a transportation study took place for extending SEPTA service from Wilmington to Newark. The proposal called for stations at Newport (near the former Newport Railroad Station), Metroform (now Churchmans Crossing), Newark, and West Newark (at Otts Chapel Road). A review by DelDOT challenged the locations of the stations in Newport, Newark, and West Newark. SEPTA service was extended south from Wilmington to Newark September 2,  1997. The Churchmans Crossing station between Wilmington and Newark opened in 2000.

SEPTA activated positive train control on the Wilmington/Newark Line on May 1, 2017.

On April 9, 2020, service on the line was suspended due to the COVID-19 pandemic, though Penn Medicine station was still being served by other rail services. Service between 30th Street Station and Wilmington resumed May 10, 2020 on a modified schedule as part of the Southwest Connection Improvement Program. Service to Newark resumed on January 25, 2021, in order to offer public transit options during a construction project along Interstate 95 in Wilmington. Previously, Amtrak announced the completion of the Delaware Third Rail Project in December 2020. The project installed the third track between Wilmington and Newark that would increase the capacity.

Name change

On July 25, 2010, SEPTA renamed the service from the R2 Newark to the Wilmington/Newark Line as part of system-wide service change that drops the R-number naming and makes the Center City stations the terminus for all lines. This also ended the combined R2 Newark/R2 Warminster service.

Station list

The Wilmington/Newark Line trains make the following station stops, after leaving the Center City Commuter Connection:

Ridership
Between FY 2008-FY 2018 annual ridership on the Wilmington/Newark Line ranged between 2.5 and 2.8 million.

See also
Bell Tower (PRR)
Lamokin Tower

Notes

References

External links

The Pennsylvania Railroad Technical and Historical Society

SEPTA Regional Rail lines
Philadelphia, Baltimore and Washington Railroad lines